Mathew John Baynton (born 18 November 1980) is an English actor, writer, comedian, singer, and musician best known as a member of the British Horrible Histories troupe in which he starred in the TV series Horrible Histories; as well as an actor in Yonderland and Ghosts. He was also the co-creator, writer and star of the sitcom The Wrong Mans. Other major television roles include Deano in Gavin & Stacey, Chris Pitt-Goddard in Spy, Simon in Peep Show, and twin brothers Jamie Winton and Ariel Conroy in You, Me and the Apocalypse.

Early life
Baynton was born in Southend-on-Sea, Essex.
He is the youngest of three boys, with two older brothers, Daniel and Andrew. He was educated at Southend High School for Boys. He graduated with first class honours from the Rose Bruford College of Speech and Drama, and later trained in clowning at École Philippe Gaulier in Paris. Baynton explained his motivation in an interview with Metro: "The performing instinct came from making my family laugh, so I've always been drawn to the funny side of things. Comedy is really rewarding."

Career

Acting and writing
Baynton is one of the performers of the hit children's television series Horrible Histories, appearing in the first five series as a singer, actor, and occasional writer. Along with the five other members of the Horrible Histories cast, Baynton is the creator, writer, and star of Yonderland, an eight-part family fantasy comedy series that premiered on Sky1 on 10 November 2013. He starred with the same troupe in Bill, a BBC family comedy film based loosely around the early life of William Shakespeare, who ventures to London to pursue his dream of becoming a playwright. The troupe also reunited in 2019 to create the BBC series  Ghosts, with Baynton appearing as a romantic poet named Thomas Thorne. 

Baynton teamed with friend and fellow Gavin & Stacey alumnus James Corden to create, write, and star in The Wrong Mans, a comedy-thriller for BBC Two that premiered in autumn 2013. The series is co-produced by online television provider Hulu.com in the United States, where it premiered in November 2013. The first six-part series proved a critical and commercial success, and a similarly well-received two-part sequel was broadcast in December 2014.

Other notable TV comedy roles include Deano in Gavin & Stacey; Chris in the Darren Boyd sitcom vehicle Spy; and William in the 2017 black comedy series Quacks.

In 2009, he appeared in a music video for Mercury Prize-nominated band, The Bees.

Baynton appeared at the 2013 Edinburgh Fringe Festival, starring in the world premiere of Tom Basden's play Holes. He reprised his role of Gus in a London revival of the same play in summer 2014.

In late 2015, Baynton portrayed Jamie Winton and his brother Ariel Conroy in Sky1's science fiction comedy-drama miniseries You, Me and the Apocalypse.

Music
Baynton is a former member of the band Special Benny as a vocalist and guitarist. Their debut album Toys was released in 2010.

He has also performed as a solo act under the name Dog Ears. His debut solo EP, So It Goes, was released in November 2011. It consists of four self-penned songs.

Radio
He appeared in 'John Finnemore's Double Acts'

Personal life
He and his wife Kelly Robinson, a film historian, have two children: a son, Bo, born in 2011, and a daughter, Ida, born in 2016. 

Baynton has commented on his son's skewed view of his father's profession: "He thinks work is putting on a beard. One day his eyes will be opened, but I do find it wonderful that that's his view of work." He commented during the same interview that while many actors do not want their children to become an actor as well, but Baynton has said that he sees no problem with his son following in his footsteps by stating that "if he enjoys it, so why shouldn't I let him?". Bo appeared as the young Mary, Queen of Scots in one episode of Horrible Histories.

Baynton tries to keep Bo and Ida out of the spotlight.  However, Baynton raised awareness about breaking gender barriers after Bo was mocked in the park for wearing a pink bicycle helmet. Baynton expressed his belief that he lets his son express his likes and dislikes freely without categorising toys and colours in gendered categories. Baynton stated "I won't be teaching my boy how to be a 'boy.

Filmography

Film

Television

Stage

Radio

Awards and nominations

References

External links
 
 

1980 births
Living people
Alumni of Rose Bruford College
English male film actors
English male stage actors
English male television actors
English television writers
People from Southend-on-Sea
Male actors from Essex
British male television writers
21st-century English male actors
English male comedians